Robert John Bagshaw (1803 – 11 August 1873) was a British Whig politician.

He was born the only son of John Bagshaw, MP for Harwich, who had developed the resort of Dovercourt, near Harwich. Robert continued the development of the town after his father's death in 1861.

After unsuccessfully contesting Great Yarmouth at a by-election in 1848, Bagshaw was elected Whig MP for Harwich at a by-election in 1857—caused by the death of George Drought Warburton—and held the seat until the 1859 general election when he did not seek re-election.

References

External links
 

UK MPs 1857–1859
1803 births
1873 deaths
Whig (British political party) MPs for English constituencies